Rachel Antonoff is an American fashion designer based in New York City. She is known for presenting her designs in creative ways, including in the form of a murder mystery, as a "sock hop," and in a dollhouse. In 2015, director and actress Lena Dunham promoted Antonoff's collaboration with & Other Stories in a short film called Vote Audrey. Dunham famously wore Antonoff's Uterus Sweater to a Planned Parenthood event where she then auctioned it off to raise an additional $4,000 for the cause. The text of her popular 2013 "I'm With Her" sweatshirt transcended into politics after Hillary Clinton's campaign adopted I'm With Her as the campaign's slogan. Antonoff starred in and was the creative director for the music video for Tegan and Sara's "Boyfriend" in 2016.

Early life and interest 
Born in Teaneck, New Jersey, Antonoff was raised in nearby New Milford, where she and her brother Jack Antonoff, singer and songwriter of Bleachers and lead guitarist of the indie rock band Fun, would commute to the Upper West Side to attend the Professional Children's School where Rachel studied theater. Her younger sister, Sarah, died of brain cancer at the age of 13. Growing up, Rachel and her brother Jack became very involved in the punk rock and hardcore music scene in the 1990s. When Jack went on tour with his band around the country, Rachel tagged along. Later Antonoff attributed this experience with influencing the way in which she creates. During her twenties, she attended Fordham University and briefly worked as a freelance writer after graduation. During the same time, Antonoff loved clothing and frequently discussed designing clothes with her roommate at the time.

When Antonoff was 22, she and her roommate and best friend began their fashion business, Mooka Kinney. The two took three designs and some fabric to their childhood neighbor and seamstress in New Jersey who then sewed six samples in her basement. The first dress ever made was called the "Swan Dress," made out of a green printed fabric with swans found at Mood, a well known fabric store in New York City. The dress was a sleeveless baby doll mini dress. From there, the two got some friends to model their designs and sent the photos to previous contacts Antonoff had from working in PR. The only response the pair received was from Teen Vogue who scheduled a meeting to meet Antonoff and her partner and to see the samples. After the meeting the contact wrote a story about the two and made a call to the buyer at Barneys New York. After the phone call the buyer placed an order for 300 units.

Career 
Antonoff founded her brand, Rachel Antonoff, in 2008, immediately after her separation from her friend and business partner. The brand's first season was Spring 2009. Rachel often includes sweatshirts in her line, because she personally favors comfortable clothing. Her line also includes a majority of dresses as she finds it easier to look put together when you do not have to figure out what goes together. The brand as a whole draws from the 1950s, 1960s, and 1970s for inspiration for prints and silhouettes. Antonoff also incorporates political themes and messages into her designs. In 2013 Antonoff designed a t-shirt with a line drawing of a uterus that became known as the reproductive tee that has remained a popular item since. The shirt was famously worn by actress and friend Lena Dunham. Since then the brand has designed shirts that have included the words "Hysterical Female" and "I'm With Her." Most of the prints for each collection are painted in-house. Rachel Antonoff's clothes have been worn by notable celebrities such as Lena Dunham, Zooey Deschanel, and Diane Guerrero.

To present her collections Antonoff is known for frequently making videos rather than conducting a live fashion show. The idea originally came from friend Lena Dunham as a way to save money, but has continued as a creative project that better captures the brand. Antonoff is known to create stories and characters for these videos and includes unique models of all sizes, her mother, grandmother, and friends. She also frequently collaborates with brother Jack Antonoff on musical choices. For instance, Antonoff debuted her Fall 2016 collection by staging a complete Broadway musical performance. The performance included a cast of dancers from the show How to Succeed in Business Without Really Trying that danced to the song "A Secretary is Not a Toy. The performance also includes live vocals from singer Ali Stroker and Jack Antonoff played the role of male secretary. The cast of dancers, soloist, and brother wore clothes from the collection.

Activism 
Antonoff and members of the band Fun formed The Ally Coalition, or TAC, to encourage those in the fashion and entertainment industries to use their influence to end discrimination against LGBTQ people. She has long been fighting for LGBTQ equality and donates a percentage of the proceeds from her collections to support organizations that share the same goals. Antonoff also offered her support to a number of other organizations including GLAAD, Human Rights Campaign, The Trevor Project, and Freedom To Marry.

From 2009 to 2013, Antonoff dated musician Nate Ruess. For Antonoff's brother's band Steel Train, she and Ruess both provided backing vocals for the song "Dakota" from the 2007 album Trampoline. Her brother and Ruess were both in the band Fun. Antonoff sang on a few songs for Fun, and acted in the widely seen video for "We Are Young", the band's biggest hit.

References

External links
The Ally Coalition, official site
Rachel Antonoff, official site
"Rachel Antonoff Fall 2015 Ready-to-Wear", style.com
"Sibling Success: The Power of 2", nytimes.com

Living people
American women fashion designers
Jewish fashion designers
21st-century American Jews
American LGBT rights activists
People from New Milford, New Jersey
People from Teaneck, New Jersey
1981 births